World Athletics Cross Country Championships is the most important competition in international cross country running. Formerly held annually and organised by World Athletics (formerly the IAAF), it was inaugurated in 1973, when it replaced the International Cross Country Championships. It was an annual competition until 2011, when World Athletics changed it to a biennial event.

History
Traditionally, the World Cross Country Championships consisted of four races: one each for men (12 km) and for women (8 km); and one each for junior men (8 km) and for junior women (6 km). Scoring was done for individuals and for national teams. In the team competition, the finishing positions of the top six scorers from a team of up to nine are summed for the men and women, respectively, and the lowest score wins. For the junior races, the top three from a team of up to four are scored.

The year 1998 saw the introduction of two new events at the World Cross Country Championships, a short race for men and a short race for women. The last time these 4 km races were held was 2006, and there are no public plans to bring them back.

In an incredible show of dominance, the senior men's team race was won by Ethiopia or Kenya every year from 1981 to 2017 in both the short and long races. In the senior men's 12 km race, Kenya won the world championships for an astounding 18 years in a row, from 1986 through 2003, a record of unequaled international success. Kenya and Ethiopia have enjoyed a similar strangle-hold on the other categories. On the women's side, only one other nation has won the long team race since 1991, namely, Portugal in 1994. These African nations were not quite so dominant in the short races, but they have won every women's junior race since its introduction in 1989.

Several athletes have won two or more individual titles: Craig Virgin, who is the only American to ever win at World Cross Country Championships, which he did twice; Carlos Lopes, the first man to win three times (although Jack Holden won the International Cross Country Championships four times between 1933 and 1939, Gaston Roelants between 1962 and 1972); John Ngugi, the first man to win five times; Paul Tergat, the first man to win five times in a row; Kenenisa Bekele, the only man to win both the short and long courses in the same year, which he did five years in a row, and whose win in 2008 gave him six long course championships, the most of anyone in history; Sonia O'Sullivan, first athlete ever to win both the long and short course double in the same year; Grete Waitz, the first woman to win five times (although Doris Brown Heritage won the International Cross Country Championships five times between 1967 and 1971); Lynn Jennings, who won three times; Derartu Tulu, who won three times; Tirunesh Dibaba, who won three times in the long course and once in the short course; Gete Wami, who  won twice at the long course and once at the short; and Edith Masai, who won the short race three times. Tirunesh Dibaba was also once the junior women's champion.

Many consider the World Cross Country Championships to be the most difficult races to win, even more difficult than the Olympic Games. At most major championships, the world's best distance runners are separated into a few races, i.e. 3000 m Steeplechase, 5000 m, and 10,000 m. However, in the absence of the short course races, the World Cross Country Championships pit all runners against one another in only one race. Thus, the competition is quite fierce. It's no wonder, then, that several Olympic Champions have gotten their start as World Cross Country Champions: Carlos Lopes, marathon, 1984; John Ngugi, 5000 m, 1988; Khalid Skah, 10,000 m, 1992; and Kenenisa Bekele, 10,000 m, 2004 and 2008. Numerous other champions have medalled at the Olympic Games or the World Championships, or have set World Records.

In the 206th IAAF Council Meeting, held after the 2016 Summer Olympics, the council decided to add a mixed-gender relay race to the World Cross Country Championships schedule – a first for the event.

Editions

Doping
As in other areas of the sport, athletes at the competition are prohibited from doping and tests are undertaken before and at the championships to ensure athletes obey the regulations. A total of fourteen doping violations have occurred at the World Cross Country Championships, with the first violation coming from Cosmas Ndeti who was the original runner-up at the 1988 junior men's race; he remains the only athlete stripped of a medal for doping. Seven doping violations have come from Moroccan athletes, with Portuguese athletes accounting for a further three. The 2010 and 2011 editions had the highest number of doping violations, with totals of four and five, respectively. The senior men's long race has produced the highest number of violations, with eight in total.

Medals

Senior Men's Individual Medals

Senior Men's Team Medals

Senior Women's Individual Medals

Senior Women's Team Medals

Men's Short Race Individual Medals

Men's Short Race Team Medals

Women's Short Race Individual Medals

Women's Short Race Team Medals

Junior Men's Individual Medals

Junior Men's Team Medals

Junior Women's Individual Medals

Junior Women's Team Medals

Mixed Relay

See also
European Cross Country Championships
African Cross Country Championships

References

External links 

 International Association of Athletics Federations
 IAAF World Cross Country Championships all-time results
 World Cross Country Championships results 1973-2005
 International Cross Country Championships 1903-1972

 
Cross country running competitions
Cross
Recurring sporting events established in 1973
Athletics team events
World Cross Country Championships
Biennial athletics competitions